Podhradie is a Slovak language term for a castle town and it may refer to one of the following places in Slovakia:

 Podhradie, Bratislava- former borough of Bratislava
 Podhradie, Martin District- village in Slovakia
 Podhradie, Prievidza District- village in Slovakia
 Podhradie, Topoľčany District- village in Slovakia

Podhradie is also part of the name of the following places in Slovakia:

 Spišské Podhradie, small town in Slovakia
 Hričovské Podhradie, village in Slovakia
 Košecké Podhradie, village in Slovakia
 Krásnohorské Podhradie, village in Slovakia
 Plavecké Podhradie, village in Slovakia
 Uhrovské Podhradie, village in Slovakia
 Vršatské Podhradie, village in Slovakia
 Zemianske Podhradie, village in Slovakia